Sarah Spiegel is professor and chair of the Department of Biochemistry and Molecular Biology at Virginia Commonwealth University (VCU). In the mid-1990s she discovered the sphingosine-1-phosphate (S1P) molecule, a lipid which has been identified as a signaler for the spread of cancer, inflammation, and cardiovascular disease. Her research continues to focus on S1P.

Education
Sarah Spiegel received her Bachelor of Science degree in chemistry and biochemistry at the Hebrew University of Jerusalem in 1974. She did graduate work in biochemistry under Professor Meir Wilchek at the Weizmann Institute of Science in Rehovot, Israel, where she earned her PhD in biochemistry in 1983, before relocating to the United States.

Career
Spiegel did a postdoctoral fellowship at the Membrane Biochemistry Section at the National Institute of Neurological Disorders and Stroke at the National Institutes of Health in Bethesda, Maryland, from 1984 to 1986. She then moved to Georgetown University School of Medicine to serve as assistant professor in the Department of Biochemistry and Molecular Biology from 1987 to 1992, and associate professor and director of the graduate program in biochemistry and molecular biology from 1992 to 1996. This was followed by a full professorship in biochemistry and molecular biology at the University Medical School from 1996 to 2001.

Spiegel became professor and chair of the Department of Biochemistry at Virginia Commonwealth University in 2002, a position she holds to this day. Since 2005, she has also served as director of the Cancer Cell Biology Program at the VCU Massey Cancer Center.

S1P research
Spiegel is credited with the discovery of the sphingosine-1-phosphate (S1P) molecule in the mid-1990s. This molecule has been identified as a signaler in the spread of cancer, inflammation, and cardiovascular disease. In 2013 Spiegel and Santiago Lima reported the discovery of the atomic structure of the enzyme sphingosine kinase 1, which produces the S1P molecule.

Spiegel's research has been continually funded for a period of nearly 20 years by grants from the National Institutes of Health. In 2003 she was awarded the National Institutes of Health MERIT Award for further research on S1P.

She is a frequent presenter at national and international conferences.

Other activities
Since 2000, she has served on the editorial boards of the Journal of Biological Chemistry, Glycoconjugate Journal, Biochimica et Biophysica Acta, and Signal Transduction.

Awards and honors
2007: VCU Women in Science, Dentistry and Medicine Professional Achievement Award
2007: University Distinguished Scholarship Award
2008: Virginia's Outstanding Scientist
2009 Avanti Award in Lipids

Selected bibliography

Books
 (with T. Levade and Yusuf A. Hannun)

Articles

References

External links
List of publications by Sarah Spiegel
"Pill May Erase Scary Thoughts" Sydney Morning Herald, May 26, 2014

Women molecular biologists
Women biochemists
Cell biologists
Hebrew University of Jerusalem alumni
Weizmann Institute of Science alumni
Virginia Commonwealth University faculty
Year of birth missing (living people)
Georgetown University Medical Center faculty
Living people
American women scientists
American women academics
21st-century American women